This is a list of aircraft of the Royal Canadian Navy covering the period until 1968 when all aircraft operations were transferred to the newly unified Canadian Armed Forces, originally with Maritime Command and since 1975 with Air Command, which has subsequently been renamed as the Royal Canadian Air Force (RCAF).

Prior to World War II (WWII) the Royal Canadian Navy (RCN) did not operate aircraft. During World War I, the Royal Navy Canadian Air Service, a component of the Royal Naval Air Service, used seaplanes to carry out anti-submarine patrols off the Canadian East Coast. After the United States entered the war, the United States Navy established two seaplane bases in Nova Scotia for similar patrols, and the Royal Canadian Naval Air Service (RCNAS) was formed to assume responsibility for these flights; however, the war ended before the RCNAS was ready to operate independently, so it was disbanded and the two bases were deactivated and handed over to the Air Board.

Canadian naval aviators including pilots of the RCN Volunteer Reserve also served in the FAA aboard carriers of the Royal Navy Pacific Fleet.  

When both aircraft and the ship failed to meet Canadian requirements,   was purchased in 1948, along with Hawker Sea Fury fighters and in 1950, Grumman Avenger torpedo bombers. The Navy considered purchasing Grumman Hellcat fighters, but these were rejected in favour of the Sea Fury.

From then until 1968, the RCN operated a variety of fixed wing and rotary wing aircraft. After the Canadian Forces sold off  in 1970, Canadian naval vessels operated only Sea King helicopters. The Trackers were transferred to land bases to perform coastal patrols, while the Sikorsky HO4S plane-guard helicopters were retired, and other types still in service were allocated as per their RCAF equivalents.

Aircraft that remained in service after unification are highlighted in blue.

Aircraft

See also
 List of aircraft of Canada's air forces

References

Notes

Citations

Bibliography
Posting War Ship Listings: Postwar Canadian Ship Listing 1945–Present
 Griffin, John A. Canadian Military Aircraft Serials & Photographs 1920 - 1968. Ottawa: Queen's Printer, Publication No. 69-2, 1969.
 Molson, Ken M. and Harold A. Taylor. Canadian Aircraft Since 1909. Stittsville, Ontario: Canada's Wings, Inc., 1982. .
 Walker, R.W.R. [url: http://www.rwrwalker.ca/ Canadian Military Aircraft Serial Numbers], 2004. accessdate: 21 January 2014.
 Howard, John. Royal Canadian Navy Aircraft Serial Numbers accessdate: 21 January 2014.
 Pettipas, Leo. Canadian Naval Aviation 1945-1968. L. Pettipas/Canadian Naval Air Group, Winnipeg: 1986,  
 Pettipas, Leo. Aircraft of the RCN. L. Pettipas/Canadian Naval Air Group, Winnipeg: 1988,

External links
RCAF.com (Includes aircraft used by RCN)
Shearwater Aviation Museum - Aircraft History
Canadian military historical aircraft

Canada - Royal Canadian Navy
Royal Canadian Navy
History of Canadian military aviation
Canadian military-related lists